Lowell Edward English (July 8, 1915 – September 29, 2005) was a highly decorated officer in the United States Marine Corps with the rank of major general who served in World War II, Korea and Vietnam. He is most noted for his service as assistant division commander, 3rd Marine Division during Vietnam War and later as commanding general, Task Force Delta. He completed his career as commanding general, Marine Corps Recruit Depot San Diego in 1969.

Early career

English was born in Fairbury, Nebraska, on July 8, 1915, and completed the high school in Lincoln, Nebraska. He subsequently attended the University of Nebraska and graduated in summer 1938 with Bachelor of Arts degree. During his time at the university, he was a member of Army ROTC unit and also played three years for the varsity football team, which was one of the Big Six Champions at the time. He turned down an offer to play football with the Chicago Bears in favor of the Marine Corps.

He entered the Marine Corps service on July 1, 1938, and was commissioned second lieutenant on that date. English was then ordered to the Basic School at the Philadelphia Navy Yard for basic officer training, which he completed in June 1939. During his time at the school, English had the opportunity to work with many great names of modern Marine Corps history, when Leonard B. Cresswell, Chesty Puller, Roy M. Gulick, Howard N. Kenyon or Russell N. Jordahl served as his instructors.

Also many of his classmates became general officers or had very distinguished careers later: Gregory Boyington, Hugh M. Elwood, Carl J. Fleps, Edward H. Hurst, Charles J. Quilter, Donn J. Robertson and Alvin S. Sanders. He was subsequently attached to the Marine detachment aboard the battleship USS Nevada and participated in the patrol cruises in the Pacific Ocean.

After one year of sea duties, English was ordered to the Marine Corps Base San Diego, California and served as a recruit training officer until December 1940, when he joined newly activated 7th Defense Battalion under Lieutenant Colonel Lester A. Dessez. This new kind of Marine units was designated for the defense of the Pacific islands from the attack from the sea and air and consisted of the batteries with 5"/51 caliber guns, searchlight and aircraft sound locator and antiaircraft groups with M2 Browning and M1917 Browning machine guns.

English spent next three months with the intensive training, before he sailed as platoon leader to Tutuila, American Samoa in March 1941 and participated in the Rainbow Five plans. During his time in Tutuila, English participated in the training of 1st Samoan Battalion, a native reserve unit. Before he left for South Pacific, English married Eleanor R. McCallum on February 24, 1941, and their marriage lasted until his death, having three children together: Loellen Kay, Bruce Browning and Becky Lynne. While at Samoa, English was promoted to the rank of first lieutenant.

World War II

Following the Japanese attack on Pearl Harbor in December 1941, the Headquarters Marine Corps activated the 3rd Marine Regiment and deployed it to American Samoa in September 1942. English was meanwhile promoted to captain and appointed company commander with 2nd Battalion. The 3rd Marines served as the part of Defense Force, Samoan Group and underwent intensive jungle training. The regiment remained on American Samoa until May 1943, when it was ordered to New Zealand in order to reinforce newly activated 3rd Marine Division.

The units of 3rd Marine Division moved to the staging area on Guadalcanal during August 1943 and began with the preparations for upcoming task – Bougainville in the North Solomon Islands. The 3rd Marine Division units were ordered to combat at the end of October and English participated in the Landing at Cape Torokina on November 1. He and his men faced heavy Japanese resistance and constant attacks of mosquitoes. He participated in the combat on Bougainville until Christmas Day of 1943, when 3rd Marines were ordered back to Guadalcanal for rest and refit.

English was subsequently promoted to major and transferred to 21st Marine Regiment, where he was appointed executive officer with 2nd Battalion under Lieutenant Colonel Eustace R. Smoak. He supervised the training of the regiment until July 1944, when they sailed to recapture Guam in the Mariana Islands. English went ashore with his battalion on July 21 and remained in the combat area until August 10. For his service on Guam, he was decorated with the Bronze Star Medal with Combat "V".

Even after Guam was declared secure, the 21st Marines continued to patrol the northern jungles for disorganized remnants of the enemy. Following the promotion of Lieutenant Colonel Smoak in late 1944, English was himself promoted to lieutenant colonel and appointed commander of 2nd Battalion, 21st Marines. He spent several months with training, before the 21st Marines were ordered to Iwo Jima in February 1945.

The whole regiment was kept in reserve until February 21, when they landed under heavy enemy fire with the orders to capture the high ground between Airfields No. 1 and No. 2. The scarred and pitted terrain made progress slow and costly. The 2nd Battalion suffered heavy casualties, and English was himself wounded on March 2, when a Japanese bullet went through his knee. His battalion was being rotated to the rear, but instead of that, he received orders to turn his men around and plug a gap in the front lines.

English later recalled the situation:

Postwar service

Due to his wounds, English was relieved by his executive officer, Major George A. Percy, and ordered to the rear for treatment. For his service on Iwo Jima, English was decorated with the Legion of Merit with Combat "V" and also received the Purple Heart for his wounds.

He was back to the United States and after full recovery in September 1945, he assumed command of Guard Battalion, Replacement Training Command at Camp Pendleton, California. English held that command until early 1946, when he was ordered to the academic staff at the United States Naval Academy at Annapolis, Maryland, as a military psychology and leadership instructor. After three years in that capacity, he was transferred to the same position within United States Military Academy at West Point, New York, and remained there until fall of 1952.

English was then ordered to the instruction at Armed Forces Staff College at Norfolk, Virginia, which he completed in January 1953 and immediately left for Korea. He was attached to the 1st Marine Regiment as an executive officer and participated in the defense actions on the Main line of resistance until April 1953, when he assumed command of 3rd Battalion, 1st Marines.

He held that command only for one month; the 1st Marine Regiment was ordered to reserve and English was attached to the headquarters of U.S. Eighth Army under Lieutenant General Maxwell D. Taylor as Marine liaison officer. He remained in Korea until early 1954, when he was ordered back to the United States. English was decorated with his second Legion of Merit with Combat "V" for his service with 1st Marines and also received his second Bronze Star Medal with Combat "V" for service with Eight Army.

Following his return to the United States in May 1954, English was promoted to colonel and appointed chief of staff, Marine Corps Recruit Depot San Diego under Major General John C. McQueen. He remained in that capacity until June 1957, when he assumed command of Training and Test Regiment at Marine Corps Schools, Quantico. While at Quantico, English was appointed commanding officer, The Basic School and was responsible for the basic training of newly commissioned officers until June 1960, when he was ordered to the instruction at Army War College at Carlisle Barracks, Pennsylvania.

He graduated in June 1961 and joined the Office of Assistant Secretary of Defense for International Security Affairs under Paul Nitze and served in that capacity until his promotion to brigadier general in August 1963. While in that capacity, English graduated from George Washington University with a master's degree in international relations.

English then served as chief of staff, U.S. Naval Forces, Eastern Atlantic and Mediterranean under Admiral Charles D. Griffin with headquarters in London, England. He returned to the United States in January 1964 and assumed duty as Deputy Chief of Plans Directorate of United States Strike Command under General Paul D. Adams at MacDill Air Force Base, Florida.

Vietnam War

English was ordered to South Vietnam in December 1965 and joined 3rd Marine Division as assistant division commander under Major General Lewis W. Walt in Da Nang. He shared this responsibility with Brigadier General Jonas M. Platt, who served as second assistant division commander with headquarters at Chu Lai. The new commanding general of 3rd Marine Division, Wood B. Kyle, ordered English to move his headquarters to Phu Bai, where he assumed command of Task Force Delta.

The situation northwest of Quảng Ngãi, where Vietcong 1st Regiment overran the ARVN 936th Regional Force Company outpost at Hill 141 in the night of 18/19 March and the ARVN 2nd Division commander Hoàng Xuân Lãm requested Marine assistance in retaking of the outpost. General Kyle launched Operation Texas and sent several Marine battalions into action. However Vietcong launched counterattack and after two days of heavy combats, English assumed operational command of the operation and extend the operation towards the south of Quảng Ngãi. The Vietcong forces were driven off and Operation Texas concluded on March 25; the Marines had suffered 99 dead and 212 wounded and claimed that the Vietcong had 283 killed.

In early July 1966, Marine reconnaissance reported the presence of NVA 324th Division in the vicinity of Vietnamese Demilitarized Zone. English received orders from General Kyle to activate Task Force Delta again on July 13, 1966. The task force consisted of four infantry battalions, 2nd Battalion 1st Marines, 1st Battalion 3rd Marines, 2nd Battalion 4th Marines and 3rd Battalion 4th Marines, one artillery battalion 3rd Battalion 12th Marines and various supporting forces.

The Operation Hastings was commenced on July 15 with the task to pushed the North Vietnamese Army (NVA) forces back across the Demilitarized Zone and the combats lasted until August 3. English used combined attacks of ground forces, artillery, airstrikes and helicopter assaults and killed approximately 700 NVA soldiers. The Marine suffered 126 killed and lot of wounded.

The situation in Quảng Trị Province forced III Marine Amphibious Force's commander, general Lewis W. Walt, to launch a large-scale operation, whose main objective was to stop the PAVN 324th Division from crossing the demilitarized zone and invading Quang Tri Province. The Operation Prairie, a series of actions in defense of the demilitarized zone, began on August 3, 1966, and English again led Task Force Delta.

Concerned by the growing PAVN activity along the DMZ and that PAVN units could move past the Marines' positions at the Rockpile and Dong Ha, COMUSMACV General William Westmoreland pushed III MAF to station a Marine battalion at Khe Sanh. English strongly opposed the plan, stating "When you're at Khe Sanh, you're not really anywhere. It's far away from everything. You could lose it and you really haven't lost a damn thing."

English participated in the operation until beginning of 1967, when he completed his tour in Vietnam. For his service with 3rd Marine Division and Task Force Delta, he was decorated with the Navy Distinguished Service Medal and also received the Vietnam Gallantry Cross by the Government of South Vietnam.

Later service and retirement

English returned to the United States at the beginning of 1967 and received promotion to major general on January 13. He then assumed command of Marine Corps Recruit Depot San Diego, California, and was responsible for the training of new recruits designated as replacements for Marine Forces in South Vietnam. English served in this capacity until September 30, 1969, when he retired from the Marine Corps after 31 years of commissioned service. For his service in San Diego, he was decorated with his second Navy Distinguished Service Medal at his retirement ceremony.

Following his retirement from the Marine Corps, English remained in San Diego and accepted a job as the director of the San Diego Museum of Man, serving in that capacity for ten years until 1982. He was active in the Marine Corps Historical Foundation, where he received a Certificate of Appreciation by then-Commandant Robert H. Barrow for his contributions to the Oral History Program.

In 1991, English was diagnosed with Alzheimer's disease, and on September 29, 2005, he died at the age of 90 at the Silverado Senior Living assisted living community in San Diego, California.

Military awards and decorations

Maj Gen English's awards include:

See also

World War II
Korean War
Vietnam War
Khe Sanh

Notes

References

 

1915 births
2005 deaths
People from Fairbury, Nebraska
George Washington University alumni
Joint Forces Staff College alumni
United States Army War College alumni
United States Marine Corps generals
United States Marine Corps personnel of World War II
United States Marine Corps personnel of the Korean War
United States Marine Corps personnel of the Vietnam War
Recipients of the Navy Distinguished Service Medal
Recipients of the Legion of Merit
Recipients of the Gallantry Cross (Vietnam)
Deaths from dementia in California
Deaths from Alzheimer's disease
Burials in California